The 1939 Toledo Rockets football team was an American football team that represented Toledo University (renamed the University of Toledo in 1967) in the Ohio Athletic Conference (OAC) during the 1939 college football season. In their fourth season under head coach Clarence Spears, the team compiled a 7–3 record, shut out four of ten opponents, and outscored opponents by a combined total of 180 to 59. The defense held opponents to 5.9 points per game and allowed only nine touchdowns, both of which remain program records. The team allowed zero passing touchdowns, which is tied for the program record.

Frank Maher, who later played in the NFL for the Philadelphia Eagles, was the team captain. He returned a kickoff 92 yards in a game against Long Island.

Schedule

References

Toledo
Toledo Rockets football seasons
Toledo Rockets football